Tureholm can refer to:

 Tureholm, Sweden, a locality located in Ekerö Municipality, Sweden
 Tureholm (island), an artificial island located in Uddevalla, Sweden
 Tureholm Castle, a castle located in Trosa Municipality, Sweden